Doris Troy (born  Doris Elaine Higginsen; January 6, 1937 – February 16, 2004) was an American R&B singer and songwriter, known to her many fans as "Mama Soul". Her biggest hit was "Just One Look", a top 10 hit in 1963.

Life and career
She was born as Doris Elaine Higginsen, in the Bronx, the daughter of a Barbadian Pentecostal minister. She later took her grandmother's name and grew up as Doris Payne. Her parents disapproved of "subversive" forms of music like rhythm & blues, so she cut her teeth singing in her father's choir. At age 16, she was working as an usherette at the Apollo where she was discovered by James Brown. Under the name Doris Payne, she began songwriting and earned $100 in 1960 for the Dee Clark hit "How About That".

Going into the recording industry, Troy worked as a backup vocalist for Atlantic Records alongside Dionne and Dee Dee Warwick. She was also part of the original lineup of The Sweet Inspirations in 1963, with Cissy Houston and the two Warwicks, who were Houston's nieces. Taking her stage name from Helen of Troy, Troy sang backup vocals for Solomon Burke, the Drifters, Houston, and Dionne Warwick, before she co-wrote and recorded "Just One Look" (the songwriting credits use the name Doris Payne). This song hit No. 10 on the US Billboard Hot 100 in 1963.

"Just One Look" was the only charting US hit for Troy. The song was recorded in 10 minutes in October 1962, with producer Buddy Lucas, as a demo for Atlantic Records. However, after Atlantic Records heard the demo, they decided not to re-record it, instead opting to release it as was. The musicians included Ernie Hayes on organ, Wally Richardson on guitar, Bob Bushnell on bass, and Bernard "Pretty" Purdie on drums. The song has been covered by The Hollies, Faith, Hope & Charity, Major Lance, Linda Ronstadt, Bryan Ferry, Anne Murray, Klaus Nomi, and Harry Nilsson in a duet with Lynda Laurence. Troy's only foray into the UK Singles Chart, "Whatcha Gonna Do About It", peaked at No. 37 in December 1964.

After moving to London in 1969, she was signed by The Beatles to their Apple Records label, and released the Doris Troy album the following year, co-produced by Troy and George Harrison. Troy worked in the UK throughout the 1970s, appearing at Ronnie Scott's Club and recording a live album, The Rainbow Testament. Neither The Rainbow Testament nor her People Records album, Stretching Out, sold well.

As her solo career peaked, she continued to sing back-up for multiple artists and bands. She contributed vocals to The Rolling Stones' 1968 song "You Can't Always Get What You Want", Pink Floyd's Dark Side of the Moon, and Carly Simon's "You're So Vain". In addition, she also sang for Humble Pie, Kevin Ayers, Edgar Broughton, George Harrison, Johnny Hallyday, Vivian Stanshall, Dusty Springfield, Nick Drake, and Junior Campbell.

In 1974, Troy moved from England back to the United States, where she played casinos and nightclubs.

Mama, I Want to Sing is a stage musical based on her life, and was co-written with her sister, Vy Higginsen, a popular New York City radio personality. It ran for 1,500 performances at the Heckscher Theatre in Spanish Harlem. Troy played her own mother, Geraldine. Chaka Khan played her aunt in the London production, as did Deniece Williams.  Mama, I Want to Sing! was also made into a motion picture, starring Ciara, Patti LaBelle, and Hill Harper, which was released on DVD in 2012.

Troy died from emphysema at her home in Las Vegas, Nevada, aged 67.

Discography

Studio albums
 Sings Just One Look & Other Memorable Selections (1963)
 Doris Troy (1970)
 Rainbow Testament (1972)
 Stretching Out (1974)

Singles

References

External links
Doris Troy info
Movie trailer to Mama, I Want To Sing
The Official Doris Troy site
The Complete Apple Records

1937 births
2004 deaths
American soul singers
Actresses from New York City
American people of Barbadian descent
American rhythm and blues singers
Apple Records artists
Deaths from emphysema
African-American women singers
Atlantic Records artists
People from the Bronx
Northern soul musicians
20th-century American singers
American expatriates in the United Kingdom
20th-century American women singers
The Sweet Inspirations members